Nicolas Vermorel (born 3 August 1999) is a French Polynesian swimmer who has represented French Polynesia at the Pacific Games. He is the brother of swimmer Guillaume Vermorel.

Vermorel was born in Papeete and is of Chinese and French descent.

At the 2019 Pacific Games in Apia he won gold in the 50m butterfly, silver in the 100m butterfly,  freestyle relay, 4 × 100m freestyle relay, and 100m freestyle, and bronze in the 4x50m freestyle mixed relay.

At the 2019 French swimming championships in Angers he won two gold medals in the freestyle and medley relays. At the 2020 French swimming championships in Saint-Raphaël he won bronze in the 50m butterfly. At the 2021 championships in Chartres he won silver in the 100m butterfly.

References

Living people
1999 births
People from Papeete
French Polynesian swimmers